Ban Zelan-e Bala (also Romanized as Bān Zelān-e Bālā; also known as Bān Zelān-e ‘Olyā) is a village in Gurani Rural District, Gahvareh District, Dalahu County, Kermanshah Province, Iran. At the 2006 census, its population was 192, in 42 families.

References 

Populated places in Dalahu County